John Robert Rudge (born 21 October 1944) is an English former football player and football manager who is now working as football adviser and club president at  club Port Vale.

His playing career began at Huddersfield Town in November 1961, but he made little impact at the club and was transferred to Carlisle United in December 1966. In January 1969 he joined Torquay United, and twice finished as the club's top scorer, before he moved on to Bristol Rovers in February 1972. He helped the club to win promotion of the Third Division in 1973–74, before departing for AFC Bournemouth in March 1975. His time on the coast was disrupted by injury, and he retired in 1977. He scored a total of 78 goals in 267 league and cup appearances in a sixteen-year career in the English Football League.

He managed Port Vale for a sixteen-year period between 1983 and 1999, easily the longest spell in the club's history. He masterminded some of the club's most successful campaigns, leading them to promotion in 1985–86, 1989 and 1993–94; he also led them to the Anglo-Italian Cup final in 1996, and to victory in the Football League Trophy final in 1993. However, he was sacked in January 1999, and subsequently was appointed director of football at their rivals of Stoke City, a position he held until May 2013. After working as a scout at Hull City, he returned to Port Vale in an advisory role in October 2017.

Playing career

Huddersfield Town
Born and raised in Wolverhampton, Rudge became a lifelong fan of Wolverhampton Wanderers. However, he turned professional at Second Division club Huddersfield Town in November 1961. He made his debut under manager Eddie Boot in the 1962–63 campaign, and was given the residence of the recently departed Denis Law. He did not feature in 1963–64, appeared just twice in 1964–65, and did not get a game in 1965–66. He played two games at the start of the 1966–67 season, before manager Tom Johnston allowed him a move to Second Division rivals Carlisle United in December 1966.

Carlisle United
Rudge made an immediate impact at Brunton Park, scoring seven goals in 14 appearances, including a hat-trick in a 6–1 win over Bolton Wanderers, as Tim Ward's "Cumbrians" finished third in 1966–67, six points short of promotion. Over the course of the 1967–68 campaign he scored nine goals in 29 league and cup games, as Carlisle posted a tenth-place finish. He made just five goalless appearances in 1968–69, and in January 1969 manager Bob Stokoe handed him a free transfer to Torquay United of the Third Division.

Torquay United
Rudge found the net just twice in 14 appearances before the end of the campaign for Allan Brown's "Gulls". He then found his form in 1969–70, finishing as the club's top scorer with 16 goals in 35 league and cup matches. He continued to regularly find the net in 1970–71, hitting 21 goals in 43 appearances, as Torquay finished tenth. However, he scored just twice in 12 games in 1971–72, as the club suffered relegation under Jack Edwards. Rudge escaped this fate as he left Plainmoor in February 1972, signing a contract with Bill Dodgin's Bristol Rovers.

Bristol Rovers
After three goals in eight games towards the end of the campaign, Rudge hit 12 goals in 29 appearances in 1972–73, as the club pushed for promotion under new manager Don Megson. The "Pirates" achieved their goal in 1973–74, as they finished runners-up of the Third Division; however Rudge played only 15 games, scoring five goals. He featured just three times in 1974–75, and moved on to John Benson's AFC Bournemouth in March 1975.

AFC Bournemouth
Rudge played seven games for the "Cherries", and could not prevent them from being relegated into the Fourth Division at the end of the campaign. He missed most of the 1975–76 season with a ruptured Achilles tendon, and made only 11 league appearances in 1976–77, scoring twice. His career was ended at age 32, owing to his Achilles tendon injury. He had scored a total of 78 goals in 267 appearances in all competitions.

Coaching career

Manager of Port Vale
Following his retirement as a player, Rudge was made a coach at old club Torquay United. In January 1980 he was appointed as a coach at Port Vale, after Rudge was recommended to new manager John McGrath. Rudge was promoted to the position of assistant manager in December 1980.

Following the sacking of McGrath in December 1983, Rudge was made caretaker manager at Port Vale. Under McGrath, the club had lost thirteen of their opening seventeen league games. The club had the third highest budget in the division, a weekly wage bill of three times that of the home gate receipts and were rooted to the foot of the table, nine points from their nearest competitors. Rudge understated things somewhat when he said: "We cannot change things overnight." However, player Tommy Gore noted "the players are in a more determined mood." He signed left sided midfielder Kevin Young on loan, and switched Eamonn O'Keefe from midfield to the attack. He was appointed as manager on a permanent basis on 9 March. He was unable to prevent relegation that year, though the club did avoid picking up the wooden spoon. Though Mark Bright and Robbie Earle were signed to Vale before Rudge's appointment, he helped to nurture their talents, both were the first of many to develop into outstanding players under Rudge.

In reality, the task in 1984–85 was to arrest the decline. Rudge achieved this aim, slashing the wage bill to offset the club's reduced income, the Vale finished 12th. Young striker Andy Jones was purchased for £3,000 from Rhyl. In 1985–86, promotion was the target. An eighteen-game unbeaten run from January to April helped to win Vale a fourth place promotion place, seven points clear of fifth place Leyton Orient. At the end of the season, Rudge turned down an offer of the management job at Preston North End.

Major signings for the start of the 1986–87 season were Mark Grew and Ray Walker (£12,000 from Aston Villa), who would feature heavily for the club in the coming years, as well as Paul Smith. Smith was purchased for £10,000 from Sheffield United and was sold for four times that figure to Lincoln City just over a year later. The club finished mid-table, twelve points above the drop. The winter signing of veteran Bob Hazell helped to shore up the Vale's defence. At the end of the season, Bill Bell was made the club's chairman. Also Darren Beckford was signed from Manchester City for £15,000. He would become the club's top scorer for the next four seasons.

In 1987–88, Vale were once again comfortable in mid-table. The cash-flow problem was eased by the sale of Andy Jones to Charlton Athletic for £350,000. Rudge spent £75,000 for Simon Mills from York City, who would be a firm fixture in the first team for the next five seasons. On 20 January the club achieved a famous 2–0 victory over top-flight Spurs in the FA Cup. Before the cup run there were rumours that the directors were considering sacking Rudge due to a poor run of results in the league. The cup run and the sale of Jones helped to put the club in the black financially for the first time in a long time.

The 1988–89 season was highly successful, and Rudge signed a new two-year contract after Port Vale beat Bristol Rovers in the play-off Final. For the first time in thirty two years, Vale were in the Second Division. A new club record was set in January 1989, as Rudge purchased classy defender Dean Glover from Middlesbrough for £200,000. The next month he added Liverpool winger John Jeffers to the squad for £35,000, using the money he received from selling Steve Harper to Preston North End. To boost the side for the oncoming 1989–90 season, defender Neil Aspin was purchased from Leeds United for £150,000, Aspin would play over 300 games for Vale in the next ten years. £125,000 was splashed out on striker Nicky Cross, who would play around 150 games over the next five years. Vale fans were not used to such purchases, but compared to other teams in the division, the money spent was quite modest. Now on a par with rivals Stoke City, both league games ended as draws, though Stoke were relegated in bottom place.

Delighted with his team, he made few changes in preparation for the 1990–91 campaign. Vale once again finished comfortably in mid-table. £80,000 was spent on Dutch midfielder Robin van der Laan, over the next five years he would become a key player. In June 1992, Rudge again broke the club's transfer record, picking up striker Martin Foyle for £375,000 from Oxford United. Foyle would be a dominant figure at the club throughout the 1990s. The money for these acquisitions came from the sale of midfield dynamo Robbie Earle to Wimbledon.

In 1991–92, the club finished in last place, five points short of the safety of Oxford United. The club were still a Second Division club due to the creation of the Premier League, though they were now in the third tier. Ian Taylor became another masterstroke signing, after he was purchased from non-league Moor Green for £15,000 in May 1992. Rudge managed his team to Wembley twice in 1993, winning the Football League Trophy final 2–1 over Stockport County, but losing the play-off final 3–0 to West Bromwich Albion. His team had proved however that they were too good to remain in the third tier for long. In 1993–94 the club went up in second place, also beating top-flight Southampton in the FA Cup. At the end of the season, Ian Taylor was sold to Sheffield Wednesday, becoming the club's first million pound sale.

The club consolidated their First Division status in 1994–95, finishing ten points above the drop. The money from Taylor's sale was reinvested into £225,000 Steve Guppy from Newcastle United and £15,000 striker Tony Naylor from nearby Crewe Alexandra. Both men would prove to be good buys, Naylor being a three time top scorer. At the end of the season, Van der Laan was sold to Derby County for £475,000 plus Lee Mills. £450,000 of this sum was reinvested in York City midfielder Jon McCarthy. £50,000 was also spent on midfielder Ian Bogie.

In 1995–96, his team finished 12th in the First Division. Rudge had Port Vale playing some of the best football ever witnessed at Vale Park. This was mainly due to his perseverance with playing a standard 4–4–2 – employing wingers who became the focal point of much of the attacking play. The club achieved another giant-slaying by vanquishing Everton in the FA Cup. He also led Vale to the final of the Anglo-Italian Cup, where they lost out to Genoa.

In 1996–97, the club finished in eighth place, their best ever post-war finish. Once again they were the best side in the Potteries. In February, he sold Guppy to Martin O'Neill's Leicester City for £850,000. Gareth Ainsworth was purchased for £500,000 from Lincoln City at the start of the 1997–98 season. This was paid for by the sale of McCarthy to Birmingham City for £1.5 million. Vale finished a disappointing 19th, a mere point away from relegation.

At the start of the 1998–99 season, Ainsworth was sold to Wimbledon for £2 million. Mills was also sold to Bradford City for £1 million. The club came even closer to relegation, finishing above 22nd place Bury on goal difference. However Rudge had already departed, Chairman Bill Bell gave him the sack on 18 January 1999. It truly was the end of an era at Vale Park. This caused outrage amongst Port Vale fans who held a "flat cap protest" (Rudge's headwear of choice) to display their disgust.

One last present from Rudge to the Vale fans was the signing of Marcus Bent for £300,000 from Crystal Palace, just days before Rudge's sacking. However new manager Brian Horton let Bent go for £375,000. In November 2000, Bent was sold by Sheffield United to Blackburn Rovers for £2 million. Another star of the late Rudge era was Anthony Gardner. Gardner was retained by Vale, and was sold to Spurs for £1 million in January 2000.

Rudge was awarded £300,000 compensation by an employment tribunal. He had been at the helm for 843 Port Vale games. Following the dismissal, Sir Alex Ferguson said: "Every Port Vale supporter should get down on their knees and thank The Lord for John Rudge."

Director of football at Stoke City

Rudge was appointed as director of football at Stoke City in 1999, after turning down the same role at Port Vale. Rudge had hoped to retire on his own terms at Vale and become a director of football at the club under a "with someone like Robbie Earle as manager". He was offered the management job at Stoke but turned it down. He has never held ambitions of being appointed manager at Stoke, and has been Director of Football under five men: Gary Megson, Guðjón Þórðarson, Steve Cotterill, Johan Boskamp and Tony Pulis.

On 2 November 2005, he had a public fall-out with then manager Johan Boskamp at Highfield Road. Rudge went down the dug-out during the 2–1 win over Coventry City to give some advice to Boskamp. The Dutchman took offence to this and said to the board 'either he goes or I go', under the belief that Rudge had overstepped the mark. Rudge maintains though, that Boskamp used the incident as a ploy, in an attempt to be paid off by Stoke as the Dutchman couldn't handle the pressure of the English game. Rudge points to the evidence that he talked Boskamp out of quitting during the pre-season.

Rudge and his assistant Jan de Koning were twice suspended by Stoke, after disagreements with Boskamp. Following Boskamp's departure and the arrival of new chairman Peter Coates, Rudge was reinstated in his role. When the club achieved promotion to the Premier League in 2007–08, Rudge was at a top-flight club for the first time since entering the game 46 years ago, in 1962.

Rudge left the Britannia Stadium at the end of the 2012–13 season in a 'major shake-up' of the club's scouting network. He left Stoke in May 2013, ending a 14-year spell at the club. After leaving Stoke he then spent the next four years scouting for Hull City.

Return to Port Vale
On 4 October 2017, he returned to Port Vale in an advisory role to assist his former defender Neil Aspin, who had just been appointed manager. He was appointed as club president on 10 August 2019.

Managerial style
Though he got his teams to play good football he was meticulous and rather cautious. He thoroughly researched opposition players and informed his players on weaknesses to exploit and strengths to watch out for. He was reluctant to use substitutions unless a player was injured as he believed in the first eleven he had selected could get the job done over the ninety minutes. He tended not to lose his temper after a bad performance, and instead Robbie Earle said that he had the "ability to make you feel guilty about playing badly".

He had the knack of spotting talented players, signing them cheaply, and then selling them on to bigger clubs for a large profit. As well as being an excellent judge of talent, he also had to be a skilled negotiator. In all he made a net income for Port Vale of almost £10 million in the transfer market.

Career statistics

A.  The "Other" column constitutes appearances and goals in the League Cup, Football League Trophy, Football League play-offs and Full Members Cup.

Managerial statistics

Honours

As a Player
Bristol Rovers
Football League Third Division second-place promotion: 1973–74

As a Manager
Port Vale
Football League Fourth Division fourth-place promotion: 1985–86
Football League Third Division play-offs: 1989
Football League Trophy: 1993
Football League Second Division second-place promotion: 1993–94
Anglo-Italian Cup runner-up: 1996

Individual
Football League Third Division Manager of the Month: November 1988
EFL Awards Contribution to League football: 2021

References
General
Kent, Jeff. What If There Had Been No Port in the Vale?: Startling Port Vale Stories! (Witan Books, 2011)

Specific

1944 births
Living people
Footballers from Wolverhampton
Association football forwards
English footballers
English football managers
English Football League players
Huddersfield Town A.F.C. players
Carlisle United F.C. players
Torquay United F.C. players
Bristol Rovers F.C. players
AFC Bournemouth players
Port Vale F.C. managers
English Football League managers
Association football coaches
Association football scouts
Port Vale F.C. non-playing staff
Stoke City F.C. non-playing staff
Hull City A.F.C. non-playing staff